The 2016 Women's AHF Cup was the fourth edition of the Women's AHF Cup, the quadrennial qualification tournament for the Women's Hockey Asia Cup organized by the Asian Hockey Federation. It was held from 1 to 9 October 2016 in Bangkok, Thailand. The top two teams qualified for the 2017 Women's Hockey Asia Cup.

The hosts Thailand won their first AHF Cup title by defeating Singapore 4–0 in the final. The defending champions Chinese Taipei won the bronze medal by defeating Pakistan 4–1.

Preliminary round

Pool A

Pool B

Classifiation round

Fifth to ninth place classification

Bracket

Ninth place game

Seventh place game

Fifth place game

First to fourth place classification

Bracket

Semi-finals

Third place game

Final

Final standings

See also
 2016 Men's AHF Cup

References 

Women's AHF Cup
AHF Cup
International women's field hockey competitions hosted by Thailand
AHF Cup
2016 sports events in Bangkok